Party Day were an English goth/indie rock band formed in 1981 in Wombwell near Barnsley, South Yorkshire, England, originally a four-piece consisting of guitarists Martin Steele, Greg Firth, bassist Carl Firth and drummer, Mick Baker. Their sound was described as being "hard knuckleduster goth with post-punk overtones".

History
The band were formerly called 'Further Experiments' (1979–81) but refocussed as Party Day. They released their first single, "Row the Boat Ashore" c/w "Poison" on their own label, Party Day Records in 1983, and was well reviewed - "their simpering and delightful sound is a thing of beauty".

Their second single, "The Spider" was described as "Excellent punk junk howl" and was played on John Peel's BBC Radio 1. We shall hopefully continue to see them rip up the roots of this bland desolate music industry.

Their debut album ‘Glasshouse’ (1985) "forms their most stunning statement to date... what they do, they do searingly well".

Much of Party Day's music was "very melancholic at heart but with a drop of venomous punk inside", and as with their second album, Simplicity (1986), their music stayed with you - "the attractive, though slightly over-wrought black sheep, "Glorious Days", which could have brought a lump to Mario Lanza's trousers."

Party Day released Rabbit Pie on the compilation LP Giraffe in Flames on Aaz Records to worthy acclaim. "Highlight though is Party Day's effort, a meaty guitar based number, Rabbit Pie. The threesome are coming on by leaps and bounds and Giraffe in Flames is worth buying just for them."

They had a strong following in Yorkshire, and were credited as being part of both the local scenes of Sheffield e.g. Leadmill and Leeds "No strangers to the local circuit, Party Day have gigged consistently for almost a year".

After the release of the Glasshouse LP there was a change in personnel, with Martin leaving due to ill-health. Other members came in, but by 1988 they broke up after abandoning their unfinished third album.

Party Day were exciting to watch live; Sounds said "They roar along, driven by a good old-fashioned pumping drum-kit, and every so often one of those elusive moving chord-sequences falls into place, leaving you completely startled" and also in the NME, "They hold their guitars like loaded AK47's. They throb".
 
For Party Day, great success and major exposure were always just a step away.

Since their demise there has been quite an interest in the band. They were included within Mick Mercer's book Gothic Rock: All you ever wanted to know but were too afraid to ask, published by Pegasus 1991 (UK)  and Cleopatra Records 1993 (USA).

Their song "Atoms" has been included on a couple of later but favourable Gothic compilations, most notable with Germany's Strobelight Records - Volume 3 (2006). And still today, their songs can be found aired at; Gothic clubs within Europe and beyond, on Livestreams. Recently on World Goth Day 2020 with DJ Benny Blanco's Livestream and with Dark Wave Radio.

2021 sees the 40th Anniversary of the Band's beginnings, those moments where fun and optimism youthfully collide. Sorted! becomes the band's latest release, a comprehensive collection of all their recordings plus demos, and released by Optic Nerve Recordings.

Discography

Singles
 "Row The Boat Ashore" c/w "Poison" (1983, Party Day Records) 
 "Spider" c/w "Flies" (1984, Party Day Records)

EPs
Glasshouse EP(1985, Rouska Records)

Albums
Glasshouse (1985, Party Day Records)
Simplicity (1986, Party Day Records)
Sorted! (2021, Optic Nerve Recordings)

Compilations
"Party Day" on Real Time 5 (1983, Unlikely Records [cassette])
"Rabbit Pie" on Giraffe in Flames (1984, AAZ Records [12" vinyl])
"Rabbit Pie" on Band-It No. 14 (1984, [cassette magazine])
"Athena" on Four Your Ears Only (1984, Play it Again Sam [12" vinyl])
"Opium Gathering" on Raw Red Heat (1984, Flame Tapes [cassette])
"Spider" on Raging Sun (1985, Rouska Records [12" vinyl])
"Borderline" on Bites and Stabs (1985, Torment Records [12" vinyl])
"Let Us Shine" on Torn in Two (1986, Torment Records)
"Let us Shine" on Zarah Leander's Greatest Hits (1987, Rouska Records [CD])
"Atoms" on Strobelights Vol.3 (2006, Strobelight Records [CD])
"Atoms" on Return of the Batcave - Vol. 1 (2008, internet only [CD])

References

External links
Party Day - official website
Party Day Facebook Page

Musical groups from Sheffield
Musical groups established in 1982
PIAS Recordings artists
British dark wave musical groups
English gothic rock groups
1982 establishments in England
Post-punk groups from Leeds